David Halpern may refer to:
 David Halpern (canoeist)
 David Halpern (psychologist)